Hematologic diseases are disorders which primarily affect the blood & blood-forming organs. Hematologic diseases include rare genetic disorders, anemia, HIV, sickle cell disease & complications from chemotherapy or transfusions.

Myeloid
 Hemoglobinopathies (congenital abnormality of the hemoglobin molecule or of the rate of hemoglobin synthesis)
 Sickle cell disease
 Thalassemia
 Methemoglobinemia
 Anemias (lack of red blood cells or hemoglobin)
 Iron-deficiency anemia
 Megaloblastic anemia
 Vitamin B12 deficiency
 Pernicious anemia
 Folate deficiency
 Hemolytic anemias (destruction of red blood cells)
 Genetic disorders of RBC membrane
 Hereditary spherocytosis
 Hereditary elliptocytosis
 Congenital dyserythropoietic anemia
 Genetic disorders of RBC metabolism
 Glucose-6-phosphate dehydrogenase deficiency (G6PD)
 Pyruvate kinase deficiency
 Immune mediated hemolytic anemia (direct Coombs test is positive)
 Autoimmune hemolytic anemia
 Warm antibody autoimmune hemolytic anemia
 Idiopathic
 Systemic lupus erythematosus (SLE)
 Evans syndrome (antiplatelet antibodies and hemolytic antibodies)
 Cold autoimmune hemolytic anemia
 Cold agglutinin disease
 Paroxysmal cold hemoglobinuria (rare)
 Infectious mononucleosis
 Alloimmune hemolytic anemia
 Hemolytic disease of the newborn (HDN)
 Rh disease (Rh D)
 ABO hemolytic disease of the newborn
 Anti-Kell hemolytic disease of the newborn
 Rhesus c hemolytic disease of the newborn
 Rhesus E hemolytic disease of the newborn
 Other blood group incompatibility (RhC, Rhe, Kid, Duffy, MN, P and others)
 Drug induced immune mediated hemolytic anemia
 Penicillin (high dose)
 Methyldopa
 Hemoglobinopathies (where these is an unstable or crystalline hemoglobin)
 Paroxysmal nocturnal hemoglobinuria (rare acquired clonal disorder of red blood cell surface proteins)
 Direct physical damage to RBCs
 Microangiopathic hemolytic anemia
 Secondary to artificial heart valve(s)
 Aplastic anemia
 Fanconi anemia
 Diamond–Blackfan anemia (inherited pure red cell aplasia)
 Acquired pure red cell aplasia
 Decreased numbers of cells
 Myelodysplastic syndrome
 Myelofibrosis
 Neutropenia (decrease in the number of neutrophils)
 Agranulocytosis
 Glanzmann's thrombasthenia
 Thrombocytopenia (decrease in the number of platelets)
 Idiopathic thrombocytopenic purpura (ITP)
 Thrombotic thrombocytopenic purpura (TTP)
 Heparin-induced thrombocytopenia (HIT)
 Myeloproliferative disorders (Increased numbers of cells)
 Polycythemia vera (increase in the number of cells in general)
 Erythrocytosis (increase in the number of red blood cells)
 Leukocytosis (increase in the number of white blood cells)
 Thrombocytosis (increase in the number of platelets)
 Myeloproliferative disorder
 Transient myeloproliferative disease
 Coagulopathies (disorders of bleeding and coagulation)
 Thrombocytosis
 Recurrent thrombosis
 Disseminated intravascular coagulation
 Disorders of clotting proteins
 Hemophilia
 Hemophilia A
 Hemophilia B (also known as Christmas disease)
 Hemophilia C
 Von Willebrand disease
 Disseminated intravascular coagulation
 Protein S deficiency
 Antiphospholipid syndrome
 Disorders of platelets
 Thrombocytopenia
 Glanzmann's thrombasthenia
 Wiskott–Aldrich syndrome

Hematological malignancies
 Hematological malignancies
 Lymphomas
 Hodgkin's disease
 Non-Hodgkin's lymphoma {includes the next five entries}
 Burkitt's lymphoma
 Anaplastic large cell lymphoma
 Splenic marginal zone lymphoma
 Hepatosplenic T-cell lymphoma
 Angioimmunoblastic T-cell lymphoma (AILT)
 Myelomas
 Multiple myeloma
 Waldenström macroglobulinemia
 Plasmacytoma
 Leukemias increased WBC
 Acute lymphocytic leukemia (ALL)
 Chronic lymphocytic leukemia (CLL){now included in theCLL/SCLL type NHL}
 Acute myelogenous leukemia (AML)
 Acute megakaryoblastic leukemia (AMKL), a sub-type of acute myelogenous leukemia
 Chronic Idiopathic Myelofibrosis (MF)
 Chronic myelogenous leukemia (CML)
 T-cell prolymphocytic leukemia (T-PLL)
 B-cell prolymphocytic leukemia (B-PLL)
 Chronic neutrophilic leukemia (CNL)
 Hairy cell leukemia (HCL)
 T-cell large granular lymphocyte leukemia (T-LGL)
 Aggressive NK-cell leukemia

Miscellaneous
 Hemochromatosis
 Asplenia
 Hypersplenism
 Gaucher's disease
 Monoclonal gammopathy of undetermined significance
 Hemophagocytic lymphohistiocytosis
 Tempi syndrome

Hematological changes secondary to non-hematological disorders
 Anemia of chronic disease
 Infectious mononucleosis
 AIDS
 Malaria
 Leishmaniasis

References

External links 
 https://web.archive.org/web/20100527085120/http://hematologic.niddk.nih.gov/info/index.htm

Blood disorders